Remilly-Wirquin is a commune in the Pas-de-Calais department in the Hauts-de-France region of France.

Geography
Remilly-Wirquin lies about 8 miles (13 km) southwest of Saint-Omer, on the D192 road, by the banks of the river Aa.

Population

Places of interest
 The church of St.Omer, dating from the thirteenth century.

See also
Communes of the Pas-de-Calais department

References

Remillywirquin